(Tseng) Hao Huang (黄俊豪) is a Hakka Chinese American concert pianist, published scholar, narrator, playwright, composer and the Bessie and Cecil Frankel Endowed Chair in Music at Scripps College.

Huang has performed in over two dozen countries overseas and authored or co-authored approximately four dozen journal articles and book chapters in classical music, popular music, ethnomusicology, anthropology, American Studies and Humanities.

Education
Awarded the Leonard Bernstein Scholarship at Harvard College at Harvard University, Huang was referred to study with Leon Fleisher. Graduating with an AB cum laude in music, Huang was selected by audition for the national Frank Huntington Beebe Award for European Study. Upon returning to the States, he studied with Beveridge Webster at the Juilliard School on a piano scholarship, earning an M.M. in piano. Huang finished his academic studies as a Graduate Council Fellow at the State University of New York at Stony Brook, earning a Doctor of Musical Arts in piano performance degree under the guidance of Charles Rosen and Gilbert Kalish.

Career
Huang is the Bessie and Cecil Frankel Endowed Chair in Music at Scripps College. As a four-time United States Information Agency Artistic Ambassador  to Europe, Africa and the Middle East, he was a featured performer at the George Enescu Festival and the Barcelona Cultural Olympiad. Huang has appeared as a recitalist, concerto soloist and chamber musician with the Mei Duo and the Gold Coast Trio in the U.K., Austria, Hungary, Germany, Italy, Spain, Portugal, Poland, Romania, China, New Zealand, South Africa, Mexico, Belize, Brazil and other nations. He has been featured on television and radio broadcasts both in the USA and abroad, and on an Artist/Educator interview on The Piano Education Page.

Huang's essay "The Parable of the Grasshoppers" was honored as American Music Teacher's 1995 Article of the Year by the Music Teachers National Association. Other scholarly articles have been published in refereed journals in Hungary, Russia, UK, Greece, Japan, Malaysia, the PRC and the USA, of which the most frequently cited are “Why Chinese people play Western classical music: Transcultural roots of music philosophy” in International Journal of Music Education 30(2), 2012; “Yaogun Yinyue: rethinking mainland Chinese rock ‘n’roll” in Popular music 20(1), 2001; book chapter
“The Oekuu Shadeh of Ohkay Owingeh” in Voices from Four Directions: Contemporary Translations of the Native Literatures of North America, U of Nebraska Press 2004; “Billie Holiday and tempo rubato: Understanding rhythmic expressivity”, co-author RV Huang, in Annual Review of Jazz Studies 7, 1994; “Speaking with spirits: The Hmong Ntoo Xeeb new year ceremony”, co-author B Sumrongthong, in Asian folklore studies, 2004.

Huang was interviewed for the 1997 Washington Post article, "Perfecting Practice". In 2002, he was featured in an interview on NPR's Morning Edition about "The 'Lost' Opera of James P. Johnson and Langston Hughes". The Wilson Quarterly reviewed his article on "Why Chinese Play Western Classical Music" in Spring 2012. In 2021, Huang initiated and narrated the nationally acclaimed podcast (authored and produced by Micah Huang) about the 1871 LA Chinatown massacre, "Blood on Gold Mountain," that reached #23 in the USA in the history category of Apple Podcasts. The podcast was featured on National Public Radio, KPBS Public Media, the Washington Post, Spectrum News 1, the digital media outlet NowThis News and others.  In fall 2022, his podcast play, "坚持 Jianchi/Perseverance," registered over half a million hits on Baidu in the PRC.

Awards and honors
In 1998, Huang was selected as a participant in the National Endowment of the Humanities Summer Seminar, “National Identity in China: the New Politics of Culture”, East-West Center, University of Hawaii at Manoa. Invited in 2005 to participate in the Mellon Foundation Inter-Institutional Travel Grant "Monuments and Landscapes" project in Xinjiang and Inner Mongolia, PRC (Vassar, Middlebury, Denison and Scripps Colleges). Huang later served as a 2008 Fulbright Scholar in American Studies at Eötvös Loránd University in Budapest, Hungary. Selected as an American Council on Education Fellow in 2012 sponsored by the ACE Council of Fellows Fund for the Future, Huang participated as a National Endowment for the Humanities Summer Scholar in the last international NEH seminar "Arts, Architecture and Devotional Interaction in England, 1200–1600", York UK in 2014.

In 2019, the W.K. Kellogg Foundation's Truth, Racial Healing & Transformation (TRHT) program awarded funds to Huang in partnership with the Chinese American Museum of LA, as executive producer of a multimedia performance event in Pico House about the LA Chinatown Massacre, one of the worst race lynchings that ever took place on the West Coast. In 2021, in collaboration with the UCLA Asian American Studies Center, Huang was presented with the UCLA Chancellor’s Arts’ Initiative Award as creative producer of the “Chinatown Elegy” transarts/educational event that commemorated the 150th anniversary of the 1871 LA Chinatown Massacre at El Pueblo de Los Ángeles Historical Monument.
It was attended by US Representative Judy Chu, UCLA Chancellor Gene D. Block, LA city councilman Kevin de León and others. In early 2022, under the aegis of Scripps College, Huang was Project Director of a National Endowment for the Arts (NEA) Grants for Arts three-part interarts performance event, American Dreams – Asian Nightmares. This work by Artistic Director and NEA commissioned composer Micah Huang explored the rich and often bittersweet history of Asian Americans in California. In Spring 2022, as a playwright and poet, Hao Huang was one of three authors selected for a 2022 California Writers Residency at Yefe Nof near Lake Arrowhead, California; later in summer 2022, he was an artist-in-residence as a composer at La Macina di San Cresci  in Greve in Chianti, Italy.

References

External links
 Hao Huang website
 Professor Hao Huang website

1957 births
Living people
American classical pianists
American male pianists
American musicians of Chinese descent
American music educators
Harvard College alumni
Juilliard School alumni
20th-century American pianists
21st-century classical pianists
20th-century American male musicians
21st-century American male musicians
21st-century American pianists
Fulbright alumni